US ballot initiatives to repeal LGBT anti-discrimination laws are anti-LGBT initiatives used to target and repeal LGBT anti-discrimination laws in the United States. These efforts started in 1972 and continue through at least 2018 on the state and local level. The person most associated with leading these efforts is Anita Bryant. After her most of this work to re-allow government discrimination are from organizations.

History
Jurisdictions in the United States began outlawing discrimination on the basis of sexual orientation in 1972, when East Lansing, Michigan, passed an ordinance forbidding discrimination based on "affectional or sexual preference". In response, opponents began organizing campaigns to place measures on their local ballots to repeal these anti-discrimination laws. The repeal movement found a national spokesperson in Anita Bryant, who helped found—and served as president of—Save Our Children. Save Our Children organized in Florida in 1977 in response to the passage by the Dade County Commission of an anti-discrimination ordinance. Bryant's campaign was successful; the Miami-Dade ordinance was repealed by a greater than two-to-one margin. Repeal campaigns, building on this success, spread nationally and several other ordinances were repealed. In California in 1978, conservative state senator John Briggs sponsored Proposition 6, which would have barred gay and lesbian people from working in a public school. The defeat of this measure, and of an ordinance repeal measure in Seattle, Washington, the same day, stalled the momentum of the repeal forces.

The mid-1980s and early 1990s saw a resurgence in ballot initiatives, culminating in proposed state constitutional amendments in Oregon and Colorado not only to repeal existing anti-discrimination ordinances but to proactively prohibit the state and any local unit of government within the state from ever passing such an ordinance. Oregon's Measure 9, sponsored by the Oregon Citizens Alliance, failed, but Colorado's Amendment 2 passed. Amendment 2 was declared unconstitutional by the United States Supreme Court in its 1996 Romer v. Evans decision. Oregon and two other states, Idaho and Maine, had initiatives between the passage of Amendment 2 and the Court decision; all three were defeated but many municipalities within Oregon passed local measures.

As the question of same-sex marriage has risen to greater prominence, opponents of such marriages have turned their attention to passing constitutional amendments barring individual states from legalizing same-sex marriages or recognizing such marriages performed in other jurisdictions. These amendments are listed here. Before the marriage issue arose, some jurisdictions had begun providing limited rights and benefits to same-sex domestic partners. These ordinances also became targets of repeal efforts, with repeal supporters meeting with less success.

Since the 2015 US Supreme Court ruling in the case of Obergefell v. Hodges, the prominence of LGBT anti-discrimination laws became the top priority of LGBT rights activists. One of the most controversial, recent, and largest repeal effort was Proposition 1 in Houston, Texas.

Ballot initiatives

Statewide level
The mid-1980s and early 1990s saw a resurgence in ballot initiatives, culminating in proposed state constitutional amendments in Oregon and Colorado not only to repeal existing anti-discrimination ordinances but to proactively prohibit the state and any local unit of government within the state from ever passing such an ordinance. Oregon's Measure 9, sponsored by the Oregon Citizens Alliance, failed, but Colorado's Amendment 2 passed. Amendment 2 was declared unconstitutional by the United States Supreme Court in its 1996 Romer v. Evans decision. Oregon and two other states, Idaho and Maine, had initiatives between the passage of Amendment 2 and the Court decision; all three were defeated but many municipalities within Oregon passed local measures.

Local level
After failing to pass Measure 9 in 1992, OCA turned its attention to passing anti-discrimination bans at the county and municipal level. Couching the debate in terms of forbidding LGBT people from receiving so-called "special rights", OCA sought not only to block ordinances in these communities but to bar them from spending money to "promote homosexuality". OCA was successful in passing over two dozen initiatives. However, in 1993 the Oregon Legislative Assembly passed a law prohibiting local governments from considering LGBT rights measures so the ordinances had no legal force. The Oregon Court of Appeals upheld the state law in 1995. Two weeks after the United States Supreme Court ruled in Romer, OCA suspended its efforts for a third statewide ballot initiative.

Domestic partnership repeal initiatives

See also

 LGBT rights in the United States

Further reading
 Faderman, Lillian (2007). Great Events From History: Gay, Lesbian, Bisexual, and Transgender Events, 1848-2006. Salem Press. .
 Keen, Lisa and Suzanne B. Goldberg (2000). Strangers to the Law: Gay People on Trial. University of Michigan Press. .
 Murdoch, Joyce; Price, Deb (2001). Courting Justice: Gay Men and Lesbians v. the Supreme Court. New York, Basic Books. .
 Rutledge, Leigh (1992). The Gay Decades. New York, Penguin. .
 Shilts, Randy (1982). The Mayor of Castro Street: The Life and Times of Harvey Milk, St. Martin's Press. .
 Vaid, Urvashi (1995). Virtual Equality: The Mainstreaming of Gay & Lesbian Liberation. New York, Anchor Books. .

References

LGBT-related lists
History of LGBT civil rights in the United States
LGBT rights in the United States
Discrimination in the United States
United States law-related lists
LGBT law in the United States